Charleshatchettite is a very rare, complex, niobium oxide mineral with the formula CaNb4O10(OH)2•8H2O. It was discovered in the mineral-rich site Mont Saint-Hilaire, Montérégie, Québec, Canada.

Relation to other minerals
Charleshatchettite is chemically similar to hochelagaite.

References

Oxide minerals
Niobium minerals
Calcium minerals
Monoclinic minerals
Minerals in space group 15